Rodger Willett Jr. (born 16 September 1962) is an athlete from the United States who competes in compound archery.

Willett was born in Hampton, Virginia.  He took up archery in 1987 and first represented the United States senior team in 2007. He has since been ranked number one in the world and has won individual and team golds at the Arizona Cup, as well as an individual World Cup final (including three of the four qualification stages) and a team World Archery Championships title.

Rodger Willett Jr. is an avid hunter, and over the years has successfully hunted world class elk, deer and turkey. Today, he his hunting efforts primarily on predator hunting, focusing on helping his neighbors with their coyote problem, as well as bobcats. Rodger is also a skilled free-diver. He enjoys spearfishing with his friends when he is not shooting his bow, and impressively can hold his breath for up to 4 minutes.

Currently he is a part of the Mathews Bow company and continues to compete on a national level. His focus as of late has been to revisit 3-D archery, which is where he started before getting involved in the FITA tournaments. Making appearances at all the ASA and IBO tournaments, in 2018 he made the podium twice, as well as picked up third at the Redding shoot in California.

He started out the 2019 season strong. He was the only archer in his class to clean the first day at the ISAA Pro Am tournament in January. From there, he went on to make the shoot-down at the first ASA shoot this year in Foley, Alabama.

Although his success in archery helps to bring in a paycheck, his full time day job is an arborist. A highly skilled tree climber, Rodger is often called upon to do jobs that are dangerous.

References

1962 births
Living people
American male archers
World Archery Championships medalists
Sportspeople from Hampton, Virginia
20th-century American people
21st-century American people